Molly dancing is a form of English Morris dance, traditionally done by out-of-work ploughboys in midwinter in the 19th century.

History
Molly dancing has been recorded in many parts of the English Midlands and East Anglia. It died out during the early 1930s, the last dancers seen dancing in Little Downham near Ely, Cambridgeshire, in 1933. On this occasion the dances performed included a tango, performed by two male dancers, one dressed as a woman. The term molly itself was used since at least 1754 for 'a milksop, an effeminate man'; see also Molly house.

The only recorded Molly dances come from Comberton and Girton, villages just outside Cambridge, researched by Russell Wortley and Cyril Papworth. Some examples of the music played for the dancers have survived. These include "George Green's College Hornpipe", collected from the Little Downham Melodeon player.

Molly dancing also occurred throughout north Manchester and Salford on and around May Day (last recorded incidence in Salford ). Though (at least by this date) there was no dancing as such, just children dressing up (the boys dressed as girls, and wearing rouge), who would then journey from house to house asking for small amounts of cash. This tradition was recorded in the works of the Opies, who wrote of journeying across Manchester one May Day in the 1950s and seeing many children taking part in this, and the related tradition (for girls) of May Queen celebrations. Molly dancing in Manchester was subject of a BBC Radio 4 Making History programme, and elicited a wide response from readers who remembered taking part. The tradition died out rapidly in the late 1950s, in large part because of post-war slum clearance programmes, which resulted in the widespread demolition of housing, and the break-up of communities throughout Manchester.

Traditions
Molly dancing is most associated with Plough Monday, the first Monday after Epiphany. Tradition has it that as a way of filling the gap between Christmas and the start of the spring ploughing season, the ploughboys would tour around the village landowners, offering to dance for money. Those who refused would be penalised in various ways (see Trick or treat) including having a furrow ploughed across the offender's lawn.

The dancers, wishing to gain employment from those same landowners shortly afterwards, would attempt to conceal their identities by blacking their faces with soot and dressing up in a modified version of their Sunday best, typically black garments adorned with coloured scarves and other fripperies. It was originally an all-male tradition but with one of the members—the Molly—dressed up as a woman.

The modern tradition
Molly dancing was revived by the Cambridge Morris Men in 1977 to coincide with the revival of the Balsham Ploughboys. The Cambridge Men still dance Molly during the day on Plough Monday. The Morris dance revival of the 1970s led to the creation of many new sides, which nowadays usually involve both men and women.

In recent years, Molly dancing has enjoyed a popular revival both in East Anglia and the East Midlands, one of the best-known teams being the Ouse Washes Molly Dancers. The largest regular assemblage of Molly dancers is at the Whittlesea Straw Bear Festival, established 1980, which is held in Whittlesey, Cambridgeshire, every January.

Modern Molly dancing demonstrates the clearest distinction between "re-enactment of tradition" and "modern interpretation of tradition" of modern morris dancing.  Elaine Bradtke wrote a PhD thesis on the inherent post-modernism of the Seven Champions, one of the first and best examples of modern Molly dance.  Many other teams have developed Molly, inspired by the unhistorical but very effective military formations of Seven Champions (e.g. Ouse Washes, Gog Magog, Handsome Molly in New Jersey, Countess Isabella's Automata) whilst others have taken it in new directions, equally unhistorical but at their best equally effective in very different ways; e.g. Norwich Shitwitches (now renamed Kit Witches) and Pig Dyke Molly.

To this day Deptford Fowlers' Troop perform Molly dances, as well as parading Jack in the Green. They take their name from a century-old troop depicted in a photograph of 1906.

References

External links

Sides
 Seven Champions Molly Dancers
 Ouse Washes Molly Dancers
 Gog Magog Molly
 Norwich Kitwitches
 Pig Dyke Molly
 Old Glory
 Soken Molly Gang
 Green River Tap & Die
 Brummie Gems
 Black Dog Molly (Facebook)
 Good Easter Molly Gang
 Madder Mill Molly (Facebook)
 Mepal Molly
 Midlands Molly
 Misfit Molly (Facebook)
 Oxblood Molly
 Old Hunts Molly
 Mad Molly (Facebook) 

Morris dance